Cissus is a genus of approximately 350 species of lianas (woody vines) in the grape family (Vitaceae). They have a cosmopolitan distribution, though the majority are to be found in the tropics.

Uses

Medicinal
Cissus quadrangularis has been evaluated for potential medical uses. As a source of carotenoids, triterpenoids and ascorbic acid the extracts may have potential for medical effects, including "gastroprotective activity" and benefits in terms of "lipid metabolism and oxidative stress". Cissus quinquangularis was used by the Maasai people of Kenya to relieve some of the symptoms of malaria.

Ornamental
Cissus antarctica, Cissus alata and Cissus incisa are cultivated as garden plants, depending on area of the world.  Succulent members of the genus such as Cissus quadrangularis are also found in the nursery trade but tend to be frost tender and are thus not widely cultivated.

Ecology
Cissus species are used as food plants by the larvae of some Lepidoptera species including Hypercompe eridanus and Hypercompe icasia. They are also consumed by  chimpanzees.

Taxonomy
The generic name is derived from the Greek word κισσος (kissos), meaning "ivy". In the 1980s the genus was split according to some details of the flower. The large caudiciform species were moved to the new genus Cyphostemma.

The genus name was established by Carl Linnaeus who used species epithets that are adjectives with feminine grammatical gender in Latin (e.g., C. trifoliata L.). This matches the pattern that names of trees ending in -us in Latin have feminine gender, although other plant names ending in -us are usually masculine.

Species
Plants of the World Online currently includes:

 Cissus acrantha Lauterb.
 Cissus acreensis Lombardi
 Cissus adamii Detoit
 Cissus adeyana Masinde & L.E.Newton
 Cissus adnata Roxb.
 Cissus alata Jacq. – grape ivy
 Cissus albida Cambess.
 Cissus albiporcata Masinde & L.E.Newton
 Cissus amapaensis Lombardi
 Cissus ambongensis Desc.
 Cissus amoena Gilg & M.Brandt
 Cissus amplexicaulis Trias-Blasi & J.Parn.
 Cissus anemonifolia Zipp. ex Miq.
 Cissus angustata Ridl.
 Cissus anisophylla Lombardi
 Cissus annamica Gagnep.
 Cissus antandroy Desc.
 Cissus antarctica Vent. – kangaroo treevine
 Cissus anulata Desc.
 Cissus apendiculata Lombardi
 Cissus aphylla Chiov.
 Cissus aphyllantha Gilg
 Cissus araguainensis Lombardi
 Cissus aralioides (Welw. ex Baker) Planch.
 Cissus arguta Hook.f.
 Cissus aristata Blume
 Cissus aristolochiifolia Planch.
 Cissus aristolochioides Planch.
 Cissus arnottiana B.V.Shetty & Par.Singh
 Cissus assamica (M.A.Lawson) Craib
 Cissus astrotricha Gagnep.
 Cissus aubertiana (Gage) P.Singh & B.V.Shetty
 Cissus auricoma Desc.
 Cissus austroyunnanensis Y.H.Li & Y.Zhang
 Cissus bachmaensis Gagnep.
 Cissus bahiensis Lombardi
 Cissus barbeyana De Wild. & T.Durand
 Cissus barteri (Baker) Planch.
 Cissus bathyrhakodes Werderm.
 Cissus bauerlenii Planch.
 Cissus behrmannii Lauterb.
 Cissus bequaertii Detoit
 Cissus bicolor Domin
 Cissus biformifolia Standl.
 Cissus blanchetiana Planch.
 Cissus boivinii Planch.
 Cissus bosseri Desc.
 Cissus bracteosa Lombardi
 Cissus brevipes C.V.Morton & Standl.
 Cissus cactiformis Gilg
 Cissus cacuminis Standl.
 Cissus caesia Afzel.
 Cissus calcicola Craib
 Cissus camiriensis Lombardi
 Cissus campestris (Baker) Planch.
 Cissus carrissoi Exell & Mendonça
 Cissus cerasiformis (Teijsm. & Binn.) Planch.
 Cissus coccinea (Baker) Mart. ex Planch.
 Cissus cochinchinensis Spreng.
 Cissus colombiensis Lombardi
 Cissus comosa Desc.
 Cissus compressiflora Lombardi
 Cissus conchigera Ridl.
 Cissus convolvulacea Planch.
 Cissus cornifolia (Baker) Planch.
 Cissus corylifolia (Baker) Planch.
 Cissus coursii Desc.
 Cissus craibii Gagnep.
 Cissus crusei Wild & R.B.Drumm.
 Cissus cucumerifolia Planch.
 Cissus cucurbitina Standl.
 Cissus cuspidata Planch.
 Cissus cussonioides Schinz
 Cissus darik Miq.
 Cissus dasyantha Gilg & M.Brandt
 Cissus dealbata Bedd.
 Cissus decaryi Wahlert & Phillipson
 Cissus decidua Lombardi
 Cissus descoingsii Lombardi
 Cissus dewevrei De Wild. & T.Durand
 Cissus dichotoma Blume
 Cissus diffusiflora (Baker) Planch.
 Cissus dinklagei Gilg & M.Brandt
 Cissus discolor Blume
 Cissus diversilobata C.A.Sm.
 Cissus doeringii Gilg & M.Brandt
 Cissus duarteana Cambess.
 Cissus duboisii Dewit
 Cissus egestosa Werderm.
 Cissus ellenbeckii Gilg & M.Brandt
 Cissus elongata Roxb.
 Cissus erecta S.H.Cho & Y.D.Kim
 Cissus erosa Rich. – caro de tres hojas
 Cissus evrardii Gagnep.
 Cissus fanshawei Wild & R.B.Drumm.
 Cissus farinosa Planch.
 Cissus faucicola Wild & R.B.Drumm.
 Cissus flavifolia Lombardi
 Cissus floribunda (Baker) Planch.
 Cissus forsteniana (Miq.) Planch.
 Cissus fragilis E.Mey. ex Harv.
 Cissus fuliginea Kunth
 Cissus furcifera Chiov.
 Cissus fusifolia Lombardi
 Cissus gambiana Desc.
 Cissus gardneri Thwaites
 Cissus glandulosa (Forssk. ex J.F.Gmel.) J.F.Gmel.
 Cissus glaucophylla Hook.f.
 Cissus glaucotricha Lombardi
 Cissus glossopetala (Baker) Suess.
 Cissus glyptocarpa Thwaites
 Cissus gongylodes (Baker) Burch. ex Baker – marble treevine
 Cissus gossweileri Exell & Mendonça
 Cissus gossypiifolia Standl.
 Cissus goudotii Planch.
 Cissus grisea (Baker) Planch.
 Cissus guerkeana (Büttner) T.Durand & Schinz
 Cissus haematantha Miq.
 Cissus hamaderohensis Radcl.-Sm.
 Cissus hastata Miq.
 Cissus heteroma Turcz.
 Cissus heterophylla Poir.
 Cissus heterotoma Turcz.
 Cissus hexangularis Thorel ex Planch.
 Cissus heyneana Steud.
 Cissus hookeri Ridl.
 Cissus humbertiana Desc.
 Cissus humbertii Robyns & Lawalrée
 Cissus hypoglauca A.Gray
 Cissus integrifolia Planch.
 Cissus intermedia A.Rich.
 Cissus inundata (Baker) Planch.
 Cissus kerrii Craib
 Cissus koordersii (Backer) Amshoff
 Cissus kouandeensis A.Chev.
 Cissus kouilouensis Desc.
 Cissus lamprophylla Gilg & M.Brandt
 Cissus lanea Desc.
 Cissus latifolia Lam.
 Cissus lebrunii Dewit
 Cissus leemansii Dewit
 Cissus lemurica Desc.
 Cissus lenticellata (Baker) Suess.
 Cissus leonardii Dewit
 Cissus leucophlea (Scott Elliot) Suess.
 Cissus lineata Warb.
 Cissus lonchiphylla Thwaites
 Cissus longicymosa Lombardi
 Cissus louisii Detoit
 Cissus luzoniensis (Merr.) C.L.Li
 Cissus macrobotrys Turcz.
 Cissus macrophylla Jungh.
 Cissus madecassa Desc.
 Cissus marcanii Craib
 Cissus mauritiana Desc.
 Cissus mexicana Moc. & Sessé ex DC.
 Cissus microcarpa Vahl
 Cissus microdonta (Baker) Planch.
 Cissus miegei Tchoumé
 Cissus migeodii Verdc.
 Cissus milnei Verdc.
 Cissus mirabilis (Urb. & Ekman) Lombardi
 Cissus morifolia Planch.
 Cissus narinensis Lombardi
 Cissus neei Croat
 Cissus nicaraguensis Lombardi
 Cissus nigropilosa Dewit
 Cissus nobilis Kuhlm.
 Cissus nodosa Blume
 Cissus notabilis Doweld
 Cissus novemfolia (Wall. ex M.A.Lawson) Planch.
 Cissus nymphaeifolia (Welw. ex Baker) Planch.
 Cissus obliqua Ruiz & Pav.
 Cissus oblonga (Benth.) Planch.
 Cissus oblongifolia Merr.
 Cissus obovata Vahl
 Cissus oliveri (Engl.) Gilg ex Engl.
 Cissus oreophila Gilg & M.Brandt
 Cissus osaensis Lombardi
 Cissus oxyodonta (Baker) Desc.
 Cissus palmata Poir.
 Cissus palmatifida (Baker) Planch.
 Cissus paniculata (Balf.f.) Planch.
 Cissus paraensis Lombardi
 Cissus parviflora Schult. & Schult.f.
 Cissus patellicalyx Lombardi
 Cissus paucinervia Lombardi
 Cissus paullinifolia Vell.
 Cissus peltata Turcz.
 Cissus penninervis (F.Muell.) Planch.
 Cissus pentaclada Jackes
 Cissus pentagona Roxb.
 Cissus perrieri Desc.
 Cissus peruviana Lombardi
 Cissus petiolata Hook.f.
 Cissus phymatocarpa Masinde & L.E.Newton
 Cissus picardae Urb.
 Cissus pileata Desc.
 Cissus pingtungensis S.S.Ying
 Cissus pinnatifolia Lombardi
 Cissus planchoniana Gilg
 Cissus planchonii Gagnep.
 Cissus polita Desc.
 Cissus polyantha Gilg & M.Brandt
 Cissus populnea Guill. & Perr.
 Cissus producta Afzel.
 Cissus prunifera Desc.
 Cissus × pseudocaesia Gilg & M.Brandt
 Cissus pseudofuliginea Lombardi
 Cissus pseudoguerkeana Verdc.
 Cissus pseudopolyantha Mildbr.
 Cissus pseudoverticillata Lombardi
 Cissus psoralifolia (F.Muell.) Planch.
 Cissus pteroclada Hayata
 Cissus pubinervis Blume
 Cissus pulcherrima Vell.
 Cissus pynaertii De Wild.
 Cissus quadrangularis L.
 Cissus quadricornuta (Miq.) Hochr.
 Cissus quarrei Dewit
 Cissus quinquangularis Chiov.
 Cissus reniformis Domin
 Cissus repanda (Wight & Arn.) Vahl
 Cissus repens Lam.
 Cissus rhamnoidea Planch.
 Cissus rheifolia Planch.
 Cissus rhodotricha (Baker) Desc.
 Cissus robinsonii (Ridl.) Craib
 Cissus rondoensis Verdc.
 Cissus rostrata (Miq.) Korth. ex Planch.
 Cissus rotundifolia Vahl
 Cissus rubiginosa (Welw. ex Baker) Planch.
 Cissus rubropilosa Lombardi
 Cissus rufescens Guill. & Perr.
 Cissus ruginosicarpa Desc.
 Cissus ruspolii Gilg
 Cissus sagittifer Desc.
 Cissus salehi Lodé
 Cissus saponaria (Benth.) Planch.
 Cissus schmitzii Dewit
 Cissus sciaphila Gilg
 Cissus senegalensis Lavie
 Cissus serroniana (Glaz.) Lombardi
 Cissus serrulatifolia L.O.Williams
 Cissus silvestris Tchoumé
 Cissus smithiana (Baker) Planch.
 Cissus spinosa Cambess.
 Cissus sterculiifolia (F.Muell. ex Benth.) Planch.
 Cissus stipulata Vell.
 Cissus subaphylla (Balf.f.) Planch.
 Cissus suberecta Bedd.
 Cissus subhastata Gagnep.
 Cissus subramanyamii B.V.Shetty & Par.Singh
 Cissus subrhomboidea (Baker) Planch.
 Cissus sue Gilg & M.Brandt
 Cissus sulcicaulis (Baker) Planch.
 Cissus sulfurosa Desc.
 Cissus sumatrana Latiff
 Cissus surinamensis Desc.
 Cissus sylvicola Masinde & L.E.Newton
 Cissus terengganuensis Latiff
 Cissus teysmannii Miq.
 Cissus tiliacea Kunth
 Cissus tiliiformis Desc.
 Cissus tinctoria Mart.
 Cissus touraensis A.Chev.
 Cissus trianae Planch.
 Cissus trifoliata (L.) L.
 Cissus trigona Willd.
 Cissus triloba (Lour.) Merr.
 Cissus triternata Miq.
 Cissus trothae Gilg & M.Brandt
 Cissus ursina Lombardi
 Cissus uvifer Afzel.
 Cissus venezuelensis Steyerm.
 Cissus verticillata (L.) Nicolson & C.E.Jarvis – Seasonvine
 Cissus vinosa Jackes
 Cissus viridescens Ridl.
 Cissus vitiginea L.
 Cissus voanonala (Baker) Suess.
 Cissus wallacei Verdc.
 Cissus wellmanii Gilg & M.Brandt
 Cissus welwitschii (Baker) Planch.
 Cissus wenshanensis C.L.Li
 Cissus woodrowii (Stapf ex Cooke) Santapau
 Cissus wrightiana Planch.
 Cissus xerophila Lombardi
 Cissus youngii Exell & Mendonça
 Cissus zombitsy Desc.

Formerly placed here
Ampelopsis glandulosa var. brevipedunculata (Maxim.) Momiy (as C. brevipedunculata Maxim.)
Ampelopsis orientalis (Lam.) Planch. (as C. orientalis Lam.)
Ampelopsis vitifolia Planch. (as C. vitifolia Boiss.)
Cayratia geniculata (Blume) Gagnep. (as C. geniculata Blume)
Cayratia trifolia (L.) Domin (as C. trifolia (L.) K.Schum.)
Clematicissus opaca
Cyphostemma bainesii (Hook.f.) Desc. (as C. bainesii (Hook.f.) Gilg & M.Brandt)
Cyphostemma cirrhosum (Thunb.) Desc. (as C. cirrhosa (Thunb.) Willd.)
Cyphostemma currorii (Hook.f.) Desc. (as C. currorii Hook.f. or C. crameriana Schinz)
Cyphostemma juttae (Dinter & Gilg) Desc. (as C. juttae Dinter & Gilg)
Rhoicissus tomentosa (Lam.) Wild & R.B.Drumm. (as C. capensis Willd. or C. tomentosa Lam.)
Strychnos umbellata (Lour.) Merr. (as C. umbellata Lour.)
Tetrastigma leucostaphylum (Dennst.) Alston ex Mabb. (as C. lanceolaria Roxb. or C. leucostaphyla Dennst.)
Tetrastigma serrulatum (Roxb.) Planch. (as C. serrulata Roxb.)

Image gallery

References

External links
Cissus striata pictures at Chilebosque
Description of the genus

 
Vines
Medicinal plants
Vitaceae genera